Azizabad-e Qeytasvand (also Romanized as ‘Azīzābād-e Qeytāsvand; also known as ‘Azīzābād (Persian: عزيز آباد) and Deh Bozorg) is a village in Pachehlak-e Gharbi Rural District, in the Central District of Azna County, Lorestan Province, Iran. At the 2006 census, its population was 154, in 22 families.

References 

Towns and villages in Azna County